The United States Air Force's 655th Intelligence, Surveillance and Reconnaissance Wing (655 ISRW) is an intelligence unit stationed at Wright-Patterson Air Force Base, Ohio.

Units
The 655th ISR Wing is currently made up of:
 655th Intelligence, Surveillance and Reconnaissance Group (655 ISRG) (Wright-Patterson Air Force Base, Ohio)
 14th Intelligence Squadron (14 IS) (Wright-Patterson Air Force Base, Ohio)
 16th Intelligence Squadron (16 IS) (Fort Meade, Maryland)
 23rd Intelligence Squadron (23 IS) (Joint Base San Antonio, Texas)
 49th Intelligence Squadron (49 IS) (Offutt Air Force Base, Nebraska)
 64th Intelligence Squadron (64 IS) (Wright-Patterson Air Force Base, Ohio)
 71st Intelligence Squadron (71 IS) (Wright-Patterson Air Force Base, Ohio)
 512th Intelligence Squadron (512 IS) (Fort Meade, Maryland)
 755th Intelligence, Surveillance and Reconnaissance Group (755 ISRG) (Joint Base Langley-Eustis, Virginia)
 28th Intelligence Squadron (28 IS) (Hurlburt Field, Florida)
 38th Intelligence Squadron (38 IS) (Beale Air Force Base, California)
 42nd Intelligence Squadron (42 IS) (Joint Base Langley-Eustis, Virginia)
 50th Intelligence Squadron (50 IS) (Beale Air Force Base, California)
 63rd Intelligence Squadron (63 IS) (Joint Base Langley-Eustis, Virginia)
 718th Intelligence Squadron (718 IS) (Joint Base Langley-Eustis, Virginia)
 820th Intelligence Squadron (820 IS) (Offutt Air Force Base, Nebraska)

References

Intelligence wings of the United States Air Force